Lake Arthur Dam is an earth-fill type dam located on the Tarka River, near Cradock, Eastern Cape, South Africa. It was established in 1924 and serves mainly for irrigation purposes. The hazard potential of the dam has been ranked high (3).

See also
List of reservoirs and dams in South Africa
List of rivers of South Africa

References 

Dams in South Africa
Dams completed in 1924